"Wrong Turn" is a song by Belgian singer and songwriter Blanche. It was released as a digital download on 25 May 2018 by PIAS Belgium. The song was written by Ellie Delvaux, Pierre Dumoulin and Andras Vleminckx.

Background
"Wrong Turn" has been described as a "smooth mid-tempo electro-pop song" that describes how sometimes one needs to find the right direction in life. The music video was released on 19 June 2019 and was directed by Nur Casadevall Castello and produced by CANADA & Blink.

Charts

Release history

References

2018 songs
2018 singles
Blanche (singer) songs
Songs written by Eightysix (Andras Vleminckx)
Songs written by Pierre Dumoulin (songwriter)
Songs written by Blanche (singer)